Nijō Tameyo (二条為世, 1250–1338), also known as Fujiwara no Tameyo (藤原為世), was a Japanese courtier and waka poet of the late Kamakura period and the early Nanboku-chō period. His Dharma name was Myōshaku (明釈).

Biography

Ancestry, birth and early life 
Nijō Tameyo was born in 1250. He was Tameuji's eldest son, a grandson of Fujiwara no Tameie, and a great-grandson of Fujiwara no Teika.

Political career 
At the height of his political career, he had attained the Senior Second Rank, and held the position of Provisional Major Counselor (gon-dainagon).

Later life and death 
He entered Buddhist orders in 1329, acquiring the Dharma name Myōshaku. He died on 18 September 1338, or the fifth day of the eighth month of Engen 3 by Southern Court reckoning, Ryakuō 1 by Northern Court reckoning.

Poetry 
Tameyo learned waka composition from his father Tameuji and his grandfather Tameie, who between them had compiled four of the imperial anthologies.

In 1303, on the command of Retired Emperor Go-Uda, Tameyo compiled the Shin Gosen Wakashū. In 1320, also under the direction of Retired Emperor Go-Uda, he compiled the Shoku Senzai Wakashū.

As a result of the accession of Emperor Hanazono, a member of the rival , to the throne in 1308, he had a bitter dispute with his cousin Kyōgoku Tamekane over the compilation of the next imperial anthology, a dispute he lost. He attacked Tamekane in his .

He was also known as a teacher of waka composition, and his students included the so-called "Four Heavenly Kings of Waka": Jōben (浄弁), Kenkō, Ton'a and Keiun (慶運).

He produced a privately-compiled anthology, the Shoku Gen'yō-shū (続現葉集), and produced the poetic theory book Waka Teikin (和歌庭訓). He left a personal anthology, the Tameyo-shū.

177 of his poems are included in imperial collections from the Shoku Shūi Wakashū on.

He was also a composer of renga, and some of his work was included in the Tsukuba-shū.

References

Works cited 
 
 
 
 
 
 

1250 births
1338 deaths
Fujiwara clan
Nijō family
13th-century Japanese poets
14th-century Japanese poets